Ergi Borshi (born 9 August 1995 in Shkodër) is an retired Albanian football player who has played as a centerback for several teams in Abissnet Superiore. Due to an injury he quits football and becomes a coach .Currently works as assistant coach in KF.Vllaznia Shkodër.

References

1995 births
Living people
Footballers from Shkodër
Albanian footballers
Kategoria Superiore players
Association football defenders
KF Vllaznia Shkodër players
KS Veleçiku Koplik players
KF Tërbuni Pukë players
KF Teuta Durrës players
KS Kastrioti players